Guterman is a surname. Notable people with the surname include:

Dan Guterman, Brazilian-Canadian-American television writer and producer
Gerald Guterman, American real estate developer
Lawrence Guterman (born 1966), Canadian film director
Marisa Guterman, American actress
Norbert Guterman (1900–1984), scholar and translator